The  is a privately owned ferry service crossing the Tsugaru Strait, which separates the Japanese islands of Hokkaido and Honshu. The company, was founded in 1973 and runs between the cities of Aomori on the northern tip of Honshu and Hakodate in southern Hokkaido.

Route
This route links the Port of Hakodate in Hakodate with the Port of Aomori in Aomori. A trip takes three hours and twenty minutes one way, and is operated by four ships: the Hayabusa, Hayabusa 3, Asakaze 5, and Asakaze 21. Each ship makes two round trips a day, with a total of eight round trips per day between Aomori and Hakodate. With the conversion of the Seikan Tunnel from conventional trains to the Hokkaido Shinkansen, this route has seen a resurgence in ridership as a budget alternative between Aomori and Hakodate.

Fleet

See also

References

External links

1973 establishments in Japan
Transport in Aomori (city)
Transport in Hakodate
Ferry transport in Japan
Ferry companies of Japan